Statistics of Empress's Cup in the 2016 season.

Overview
It was contested by 48 teams, and INAC Kobe Leonessa won the championship.

Results

1st round
Hiroshima Bunkyo Women's University High School 0-3 Clubfields Linda
Fujieda Junshin High School 1-2 Sendai University
Tokuyama University 0-5 Nippatsu Yokohama FC Seagulls
JFA Academy Fukushima 8-1 Shikoku Gakuin University
NGU Nagoya FC 0-2 Orca Kamogawa FC
Norddea Hokkaido 1-4 Hinomoto Gakuen High School
Shizuoka Sangyo University 1-0 Urawa Reds Youth
AS Harima ALBION 4-1 Nippon TV Menina
Kamimura Gakuen High School 3-2 Seiwa Gakuen High School
Cerezo Osaka Sakai 3-1 Fukui University of Technology Fukui High School
Fukuoka J. Anclas 0-5 Waseda University
Bunnys Kyoto SC 1-0 University of Tsukuba
Toyo University 3-0 Japan Soccer College
Mashiki Renaissance Kumamoto FC 3-2 Tokoha University Tachibana High School
Tokyo International University 1-0 Angeviolet Hiroshima
Daisho Gakuen High School 1-0 Niigata University of Health and Welfare

2nd round
Nippon TV Beleza 12-0 Clubfields Linda
Ehime FC 5-0 Sendai University
Konomiya Speranza Osaka-Takatsuki 1-3 Nippatsu Yokohama FC Seagulls
JEF United Chiba 4-0 JFA Academy Fukushima
Albirex Niigata 4-1 Orca Kamogawa FC
Chifure AS Elfen Saitama 3-1 Hinomoto Gakuen High School
Nippon Sport Science University 5-0 Shizuoka Sangyo University
AC Nagano Parceiro 5-1 AS Harima ALBION
Vegalta Sendai 7-0 Kamimura Gakuen High School
Sfida Setagaya FC 3-0 Cerezo Osaka Sakai
Nojima Stella Kanagawa Sagamihara 3-2 Waseda University
Okayama Yunogo Belle 1-0 Bunnys Kyoto SC
Iga FC Kunoichi 4-0 Toyo University
Urawa Reds 6-0 Mashiki Renaissance Kumamoto FC
Kibi International University 2-2 (pen 5-4) Tokyo International University
INAC Kobe Leonessa 1-0 Daisho Gakuen High School

3rd round
Nippon TV Beleza 8-1 Ehime FC
Nippatsu Yokohama FC Seagulls 1-2 JEF United Chiba
Albirex Niigata 1-0 Chifure AS Elfen Saitama
Nippon Sport Science University 1-2 AC Nagano Parceiro
Vegalta Sendai 5-1 Sfida Setagaya FC
Nojima Stella Kanagawa Sagamihara 3-1 Okayama Yunogo Belle
Iga FC Kunoichi 0-2 Urawa Reds
Kibi International University 0-3 INAC Kobe Leonessa

Quarterfinals
Nippon TV Beleza 1-0 JEF United Chiba
Albirex Niigata 2-0 AC Nagano Parceiro
Vegalta Sendai 2-0 Nojima Stella Kanagawa Sagamihara
Urawa Reds 0-1 INAC Kobe Leonessa

Semifinals
Nippon TV Beleza 0-1 Albirex Niigata
Vegalta Sendai 1-3 INAC Kobe Leonessa

Final
INAC Kobe Leonessa 0-0 (pen 5-4) Albirex Niigata
INAC Kobe Leonessa won the championship.

References

Empress's Cup
2016 in Japanese women's football